Mouzinho de Albuquerque is the name of a prominent Portuguese family of the 19th century. Its members included:
 João Pedro Mouzinho de Albuquerque (1736–1802), nobleman
 Luís da Silva Mouzinho de Albuquerque (1792–1846), son of João Pedro, military officer, poet, engineer, scientist, liberal politician and statesman
 João Mouzinho de Albuquerque (1797–1881), son of João Pedro, writer and administrator
 Joaquim Augusto Mouzinho de Albuquerque (1855–1902), grandson of Luís da Silva, military officer and African expeditionary